Carl Deichman (1705  – 21 April 1780) was a  Norwegian businessman, industrialist, book collector and philanthropist.  His endowment lead to the founding  of the Oslo Public Library officially known as  Deichman Library (Deichmanske bibliotek).

Biography
Deichman was born in Viborg, Denmark. He grew up in Christiania (now Oslo), Norway. 

He was the one of the six children of Bartholomæus Deichman (1671–1731), Bishop of Christiania and Else Rosemeyer (ca. 1669-1745). He received his early education at home and was taught Latin, language, history and political science.  He was first employed  in 1726  at the court of King Frederick IV in Copenhagen.  In 1733, he was appointed Chancellor and assessor in the court trial in Christiania. He later settled at Porsgrunn in Telemark where he lived the rest of his life.

Deichman had learned a practical knowledge of mining operations at the  Kongsberg Silver Mines. 
After the death of his father's brother Evert Deichman in 1734, he purchased  Fossum works  (Fossum Verk) at Gjerpen in Telemark  together with his elder brother,  Vilhelm Deichman (1709-1769) and  brother-in-law Herman Leopoldus Løvenskiold (1701–1759), husband of their sister  Margrethe Deichman.
Carl and Vilhelm Deichman became co-owners of Bolvig Ironworks (Bolvik Jernverk) in Telemark in 1734-1741. In 1737 he bought the share of Herman Løvenskiold.
From 1753 the brothers were also for a time co-owners of  Eidsfoss Ironworks  (Eidsfoss jernverk) in Vestfold. 
After his brother Vilhelm died in 1769, Carl Deichman became the sole owner of their not insignificant common fortune.

Deichman Library
At the time of his death in 1780, his personal collection consisted of over 6,000 books in addition to manuscripts, diplomas, maps, antiques and a coin collection. In his will Carl Deichman bequeathed his book collection to the city of Christiania. Deichman Library  was opened in 1785. This collection and an additional endowment formed the initial basis for the Deichmanske bibliotek of the Oslo Public Library.  Deichman Library now consists of 22 branch libraries located all over Oslo. Carl Deichman's original collection is still intact and is well preserved in the main library.

References

Other sources
 Nils Johan Ringdal (1985) By, bok og borger Deichmanske bibliotek gjennom 200 år (Oslo: Aschehoug)

External links
Deichmanske bibliotek  website

1705 births
1780 deaths
Norwegian industrialists
Norwegian businesspeople in mining
Norwegian philanthropists
Norwegian book and manuscript collectors
People from Viborg Municipality
18th-century philanthropists